Sepasitik, also Püsku-Sitik, is an unpopulated island 700 meters away from  Saaremaa. It belongs to the country of Estonia.

See also
List of islands of Estonia

Islands of Estonia
Saaremaa Parish